The UAAP Season 65 men's basketball tournament refers to the men's basketball tournament of UAAP Season 65 (2002–03 season) of the University Athletic Association of the Philippines (UAAP). The tournament was hosted by National University. ABS-CBN covered the games on Studio 23.

Four-time defending champion De La Salle Green Archers were on their way on scoring a rare 14–0 sweep of the elimination round when they were stopped by the Ateneo Blue Eagles in their last game of eliminations. The UE Red Warriors won over the UST Growling Tigers on the elimination round finale to secure the #2 seed against Ateneo in the semifinals. UST were blown out by La Salle in their semifinals series, while Ateneo won twice against UE, the deciding game via last-second shot from Gec Chia, to face La Salle in the Finals, a rematch of the previous season's championship series. In Game 1, Ateneo upset the Green Archers, but La Salle tied the series on the next game. In the deciding Game 3, Ateneo pulled away late in the fourth quarter to win their first title since 1988.

Ateneo's Enrico Villanueva was named Most Valuable Player, while teammates Larry Fonacier and Wesley Gonzales were named co-MVPs of the Finals.

Coaches

Current coaches
  – Luigi Trillo 
  – Joel Banal
  – Franz Pumaren
  – Koy Banal
  – Manny Dandan
  – Boyzie Zamar
  – Ryan Gregorio
  – Aric del Rosario

Coaching changes

Elimination round

With a 14–0 sweep giving them a bye up to the best-of-3 finals, La Salle won their first thirteen games; their last game was against arch rival Ateneo. The two teams were locked 43–all when Wesley Gonzales, Rich Alvarez, Larry Fonacier and Andrew Cruz engineered a 21–3 run to put Ateneo up 64–46 with eight minutes left in the fourth quarter. Alvarez scored on a slam dunk to give Ateneo the biggest lead of the game, 73–53 with 3:13 left. Ateneo's lead would be insurmountable as they prevented the sweep and moved to second place.
UE won over UST 76–69 to seize the #2 seed and the twice to beat advantage against Ateneo; UST will face La Salle in the other semifinal pairing.

Match-up results

Scores
Results on top and to the right of the dashes are for first-round games; those to the bottom and to the left of it are second-round games.

Bracket

Semifinals
La Salle and UE have the twice-to-beat advantage. They only have to win once, while their opponents, twice, to progress.

La Salle vs. UST

La Salle, led by Mark Cardona and BJ Manalo, opened a 30–14 lead in the first quarter and never relinquished the lead. The lead reached 26 points in the third quarter. The Tigers cut the lead to 59–72 with a 7–0 run at the start of the fourth quarter, and another time, this time with an 11-point lead with a 78–89 scoreline, but La Salle's lead was too big for the Tigers to overcome.

UE vs. Ateneo

Game 1

Ateneo defeated UE to extend their series to a deciding second game. While Most Valuable Player (MVP) candidate James Yap was limited to only four points by the Ateneo defense, returning LA Tenorio (who was previously injured with a hand injury) led the decisive run that increased Ateneo's lead to 11 points to prevent their elimination.

Game 2

The deciding game would also go down to the wire; Gec Chia turned over the ball to UE, where James Yap converted at the other end to put the Red Warriors up, 70–68. Chia would later score to force the game's seventh and last deadlock with 35 seconds left. Yap missed a three-pointer on the ensuing possession, Jay-arr Estrada grabbed the rebound but Paul Artadi committed a turnover. With Ateneo now having the possession with 7.8 seconds remaining, LA Tenorio dribbled the entire length of the court to find his path blocked by two UE players. Off a pick from Enrico Villanueva, Chia scored a 15-foot jump shot to win the game for Ateneo and eliminate UE from contention.

Finals

Game 1

Ateneo kept pace with La Salle throughout much of the game, with the Green Archers leading by as much as eight and the Eagles giving up hairline leads. Late in the game, LA Tenorio missed both free-throws, but drew an offensive foul from Mike Cortez to give Ateneo the possession with 39.3 seconds left. Rich Alvarez missed consecutive shots, but Enrico Villanueva split his free-throws to put Ateneo up by two points with 9.2 seconds remaining. In the ensuing possession, Mark Cardona attempted a field goal twice but was blocked each time by Larry Fonacier as time expired to give Ateneo a 1–0 series lead.

Game 2

After the first game, La Salle coach Franz Pumaren talked to Mike Cortez where he reminded him that as a veteran, he should lead by example to his teammates. La Salle started strongly, leading 50–32, capped off a slam dunk from Cortez off an Ateneo turnover. The Blue Eagles will cut the deficit to nine points at 64–55, but Cortez scored each time to prevent Ateneo from cutting the lead even further. With La Salle up 78–73, Fonacier scored on a put-back; Adonis Sta. Maria scored at the other end to restore the 5-point lead, with 65 seconds left. Enrico Villanueva scored via two free-throws, but Carlo Sharma scored two points also from the free-throw line. LA Tenorio drove hard to the basket but missed; Santa Maria was fouled on the rebound attempt. Santa Maria made both free-throws, Cortez caught the airball from Fonacier's three-pointer, was fouled, and split his free-throws to end the game. La Salle evened the series and forced a deciding games off Cortez' 21 points.

Game 3

 Finals Most Valuable Player: co-awardees, 

Ateneo led for much of the game via small margins, when LA Tenorio made successive three-point shots and Wesley Gonzales made a lay-up to give Ateneo a 10-point 64–54 lead; the two players would later leave the game due to fouls for the former and cramps from the latter. Sonny Tadeo and Epok Quimpo scored on a 5-point run to add Ateneo's lead to eleven points with barely over two minutes left. Adonis Santa Maria narrowed the gap to 66–73 but Villanueva made it a 9-point lead after being fouled by Santa Maria during a rebound play off Fonacier's miss. Santa Maria and BJ Manalo scored a 4–0 run, but Fonacier scored on the free-throw line off a Cortez to foul to win the championship for Ateneo, their first since their consecutive title run from 1987 to 1988, and denying La Salle to set a new record of a 5th-consecutive men's title in the Final Four era.

Broadcast notes

UAAP Final Four
September 19, 2002

September 22, 2002

UAAP Finals

Awards
The awards were given out prior to Game 2 at the Araneta Coliseum:
Most Valuable Player: 
Rookie of the Year: 
Mythical Five:

See also
NCAA Season 78 basketball tournaments

References

65
2002 in Philippine basketball
UAAP Season 65